John Armatage (born 5 August 1929, Newcastle upon Tyne, England) is an English jazz swing drummer and arranger.

Armatage began professional work in 1957 when he gigged with John Chilton and then recorded, toured and made a film with Bruce Turner, the film called Living Jazz (1962). He has played with artists such as Pete Allen and Terry Lightfoot. He has done collaborative work with Pee Wee Russell.

References

1929 births
Living people
English jazz drummers
British male drummers
Musicians from Newcastle upon Tyne
British male jazz musicians